Abdul Wahab Ibrahim (born 13 January 1999) is a Ghanaian professional footballer who plays as a leftback for Portuguese club Real.

Club career
A youth product of WAFA in Ghana, he moved to the reserves of Chaves in 2017. On 11 August 2020, Ibrahim joined Famalicão in the Primeira Liga. Ibrahim made his professional debut with Famalicão in a 5-1 league loss to Benfica on 18 September 2020.

References

External links
 
 

1999 births
Living people
Ghanaian footballers
Association football fullbacks
West African Football Academy players
F.C. Famalicão players
Real S.C. players
Ghana Premier League players
Campeonato de Portugal (league) players
Primeira Liga players
Ghanaian expatriate footballers
Ghanaian expatriate sportspeople in Portugal
Expatriate footballers in Portugal